Heath Backhouse (born ) is a South African rugby union player for the  in the Currie Cup. His regular position is lock.

He previously represented  in Rugby Pro D2, making 22 appearances over the course of the 2018–19 and 2019–20 seasons, scoring one try. He joined the  ahead of the newly formed Super Rugby Unlocked competition.

References

South African rugby union players
Living people
1998 births
Rugby union locks
Biarritz Olympique players
Pumas (Currie Cup) players
SC Albi players